Ann Bowman Jannetta (born 1932) is an American academic, historian, author, Japanologist and Professor of History Emerita at the University of Pittsburgh.

Selected works
In a statistical overview derived from writings by and about Ann Jannetta, OCLC/WorldCat encompasses roughly 4 works in 10+ publications in 1 language and 500+ library holdings

 Epidemics and mortality in Tokugawa Japan: 1600-1868 (1983)
 Public health and the diffusion of vaccination in Japan (1996)
 The vaccinators: smallpox, medical knowledge, and the "opening" of Japan (2007)

Honors
 Association for Asian Studies, John Whitney Hall Book Prize, 2009.

Notes

External links
 National Academy of Medicine,  Hanaoka Seishu's Surgical Casebook

1932 births
Living people
American Japanologists
University of Pittsburgh faculty
21st-century American historians
American women historians
21st-century American women writers
Women orientalists